Scott Walker (born 6 August 1970) is an Australian bobsledder. He competed at the 1994 Winter Olympics and the 1998 Winter Olympics.

References

External links
 

1970 births
Living people
Australian male bobsledders
Olympic bobsledders of Australia
Bobsledders at the 1994 Winter Olympics
Bobsledders at the 1998 Winter Olympics
Sportspeople from Perth, Western Australia